"New Fool at an Old Game" is a song first recorded by Canadian country music artist Michelle Wright.  Wright's version was released in 1987 on Savannah Records as the second single from her 1988 album Do Right by Me and peaked at number 11 on RPM Country Tracks chart in Canada.  American Country Music Hall of Fame artist Reba McEntire released her version in December 1988 as the third single from her album Reba.  It was her twelfth number one on the country chart.  The single went to number one for one week and spent a total of fourteen weeks on the country chart. The song was written by Steve Bogard, Rick Giles, and Sheila Stephen.

Chart performance

Michelle Wright

Reba McEntire

Year-end charts

References

1987 songs
1987 singles
1988 singles
Reba McEntire songs
Michelle Wright songs
MCA Records singles
Songs written by Steve Bogard
Songs written by Rick Giles
Song recordings produced by Jimmy Bowen